Belmont is a suburb of Hastings in East Sussex, England. The village falls within the Borough of Hastings.

Suburbs of Hastings